Kani Sefid (also Romanized as Kānī Sefīd) is a village in Kenarporuzh Rural District, in the Central District of Salmas County, West Azerbaijan Province, Iran. At the 2006 census, its population was 225, in 40 families.

References 

Populated places in Salmas County